Lake Horney, named for Julius Teague Horney, is a lake that is located in Polk County, Florida.

History 
The lake is named after Julius Teague Horney (1888–1959), who helped develop Lakeland in the 1920s.

Nearby locations 
Lakeland Senior High School (Florida)/Lois Cowles Harrison Center for the Visual and Performing Arts

References

External links
Lake Horny Shore - City of Lakeland
Polk County wateratlas
Lake Horney Topo Map in Polk County FL Topozone

Reservoirs in Florida
Lakes of Polk County, Florida